The Lifan Maiwei (迈威) is a Chinese five-door compact crossover SUV produced by the Lifan Motors, division of Lifan Group. The Lifan Maiwei initially debuted on the 2016 Beijing Auto Show.

Overview 

Price range of the Lifan Maiwei is between 56,800 yuan to 73,800 yuan.

References

External links
Lifan Motors website

Maiwei
Cars introduced in 2016
2010s cars
Compact sport utility vehicles
Crossover sport utility vehicles
Cars of China